Orocrambus enchophorus is a moth in the family Crambidae. It was described by Edward Meyrick in 1885. It is endemic to New Zealand. It has been recorded from the South Island and North Island. The lives in lowland to alpine grassland habitat.

Description

The wingspan is 24–40 mm. Adults have been recorded on wing from November to February.

The larvae feed on Poa annua, Poa cita (formerly Poa caespitosa), Agrostis tenuis, Bromus catharticus and Festuca arundinacea.

References

Crambinae
Moths of New Zealand
Moths described in 1885
Endemic fauna of New Zealand
Taxa named by Edward Meyrick
Endemic moths of New Zealand